Green Eggs and Ham is a children's book by Dr. Seuss, first published on August 12, 1960. As of 2019, the book has sold 8 million copies worldwide. The story has appeared in several adaptations, starting with 1973's Dr. Seuss on the Loose starring Paul Winchell as the voice of both characters, and more recently an animated TV series of the same name on Netflix (which also gave the originally unnamed character Sam pesters the name "Guy-Am-I").

Plot

Sam-I-Am offers Guy-Am-I a plate of green eggs and ham. However, he refuses repeatedly throughout the story, saying "I do not like green eggs and ham. I do not like them, Sam-I-Am." Sam further asks him to eat that food in various locations (house, box, car, tree, train, dark, rain, boat) and with a few different animals (mouse, fox, goat), but is still rebuffed. Finally, Sam-I-am asks the man to try them, and he accepts the green eggs and ham. When he declares that he likes them, he happily says, "I do so like green eggs and ham. Thank you. Thank you, Sam-I-Am."

Background 
Green Eggs and Ham is one of Seuss's "Beginner Books", written with very simple vocabulary for beginning readers. The vocabulary of the text consists of just 50 words and was the result of a bet between Seuss and Bennett Cerf, Dr. Seuss's publisher, that Seuss (after completing The Cat in the Hat using 236 words) could not complete an entire book without exceeding that limit. The 50 words are a, am, and, anywhere, are, be, boat, box, car, could, dark, do, eat, eggs, fox, goat, good, green, ham, here, house, I, if, in, let, like, may, me, mouse, not, on, or, rain, Sam, say, see, so, thank, that, the, them, there, they, train, tree, try, will, with, would, and you. Anywhere is the only word used that has more than one syllable.

Reception and cultural impact 
Green Eggs and Ham was published on August 12, 1960. By 2001, it had become the fourth-best selling English-language children's hardcover book yet written.  the book has sold 8 million copies. In 1999, the National Education Association (NEA) conducted an online survey of children and teachers, seeking the 100 most popular children's books. The children ranked Green Eggs and Ham third, just above another Dr. Seuss book, The Cat in the Hat. The teachers ranked it fourth. Teachers ranked it fourth again in a 2007 NEA poll. Scholastic Parent & Child magazine placed it #7 among the "100 Greatest Books for Kids" in 2012. That same year, it was ranked number 12 among the "Top 100 Picture Books" in a survey published by School Library Journal – the first of five Dr. Seuss books on the list.

The book has become sufficiently ingrained in the cultural consciousness that U.S. District Court Judge James Muirhead referenced Green Eggs and Ham in his September 21, 2007, court ruling after receiving an egg in the mail from prisoner Charles Jay Wolff, who was protesting against the prison diet. Muirhead ordered the egg destroyed and rendered his judgment in the style of Seuss. Senator Ted Cruz read the book on the floor of the United States Senate during his filibuster over the funding of Obamacare. Musician will.i.am has stated that his moniker is inspired by the story.

On September 28, 1991, following Dr. Seuss' death earlier that week, Jesse Jackson recited an excerpt of Green Eggs and Ham on Saturday Night Live during a special tribute segment.

Adaptations

TV, film, and stage
In 1973, Green Eggs and Ham became the third of the three Theodor Geisel stories, joining The Sneetches and The Zax, to be adapted into the television special Dr. Seuss on the Loose, which featured a connecting narration by The Cat In The Hat. The cartoon was voiced by Paul Winchell. The book was also released as a Beginner Book Video on VHS which included The Cat In The Hat in 1994, and rereleased with The Tooth Book and Ten Apples Up on Top in 1997.
 
The story was featured as one of the segments brought to life in stage-play fashion in the 1994 TV-film In Search of Dr. Seuss.

Sam-I-Am appeared as a recurring character in season two of The Wubbulous World of Dr. Seuss, performed here by John Kennedy. In one episode of the show, Sam assists the Cat in the Hat and his Little Cats with their indoor picnic by preparing his special jumbo green ham and cheese sandwich.

It is adapted as part of Seussical as a number during curtain call.

A 2D hand-drawn animated television series based on the book, Green Eggs and Ham premiered on Netflix in November 2019. It was produced by Warner Bros. Animation and A Very Good Production and distributed by Warner Bros. Television. The cast features Michael Douglas as Guy-Am-I (the unnamed character in the original book) and Adam DeVine as Sam-I-Am, with Ellen DeGeneres serving as executive producer. The fox (named Michael and voiced by Tracy Morgan), mouse (nicknamed Squeaky by Sam and voiced by Daveed Diggs), and goat (simply named The Goat and voiced by John Turturro) appear as secondary recurring characters.

Parodies
The Animaniacs episode "The Warners and The Beanstalk" parodies both Green Eggs and Ham and Jack and The Beanstalk. After Ralph T. Guard in the role of a giant captures Yakko, Wakko, and Dot, the Warners try to get him to eat 'gold eggs and meat', but the giant refuses each time, saying, "I does not like gold eggs and meat. It's you who I would like to eat". The opening lines are spoofed by Ernest Hemingway as "I am sad. Sad, I am. I would not eat blue figs and lamb" in "Papers for Papa".

The Johnny Bravo episode "Cookie Crisis" has Little Suzy as a Buttercup Scout trying to get Johnny to buy her cookies. Johnny is on a strict diet and attempts to avoid her, but she keeps following him at every turn.  

The Green Eggs & Sham live album by English punk rock band Sham 69, released in 1999, parodies the book title itself.

The Regular Show episode title "Pam I Am" is a pun on the character Sam-I-Am, but not the story itself.

Upstate New York Hazardous Materials Warning incident
The quote "Would you. Could you. On a train?" was unexpectedly used on a misinformed Emergency Alert System activation targeting viewers in Upstate New York shortly before the train crash in Hoboken, New Jersey on September 27, 2016. The quote was used on a Hazardous Materials Warning message that was accidentally activated on Utica's NBC television station WKTV during an evening newscast.

Restaurant 
At Universal's Islands of Adventure, in Seuss Landing, there is a restaurant called Green Eggs and Ham Cafe that originally served green eggs and ham sandwiches, cheeseburgers, chicken sandwiches, chicken fingers, and fries. As of 2019, the restaurant now serves tater tot-based meals, including green eggs and ham tots.

Video games

Dr. Seuss: Green Eggs and Ham is a single-player, handheld video game for Game Boy Advance based on the 1960 book of the same name published by NewKidCo and released in November 2003. The book was also made into a Living Books adaptation for the PC in 1996, and there were similar differences to reflect the new media such as Sam-I-Am sings his opening lines.

Selected translations 
 Huevos verdes con jamón (1960, Spanish)
 Groene eieren met ham (1960s, Dutch)
 לֹא רָעֵב וְלֹא אוֹהֵב (Lo ra'ev ve-lo ohev, 1982, Hebrew )
 火腿加綠蛋 (Huǒ tuǐ jiā lǜ dàn, 1992, Chinese)
 Prosciutto e uova verdi (2002, Italian)
 Virent ova! Viret perna! (2003, Latin)
 Kto zje zielone jajka sadzone? (2004, Polish)
 Les œufs verts au jambon (2009, French)
 Grünes Ei mit Speck (2011, German)
 Ovos Verdes e Presunto (2016, Portuguese)
 Grønne egg og Skinke (March 2021, Norwegian)

References

External links 

 

Adaptations of works by Dr. Seuss
Books by Dr. Seuss
Constrained writing
1960 children's books
Eggs in culture
American picture books
Random House books